Șinca Nouă is a commune in Brașov County, Transylvania, Romania. It is composed of two villages, Paltin and Șinca Nouă, and also administers a hamlet, Strâmba.

The commune is located in the central part of the county, in a hilly area between the Piatra Craiului Mountains to the south and the Olt River to the north, at the eastern edge of the historic Țara Făgărașului region. It lies on the banks of the Șercaia River, a left tributary of the Olt.

Șinca Nouă is crossed by national road DN73A, which runs from Predeal to Șercaia.

The  dates from 1761.

References

Communes in Brașov County
Localities in Transylvania